H. K. Firodia Awards for excellence in science and technology are given annually by the H. K. Firodia Foundation. The awards  were initiated in 1996 to recognize achievements by Indian scientists in any field of science, and aim to promote a scientific spirit among young Indians.

The awards are given at a ceremony in Pune, at hands of eminent chief guests such as Kapil Sibal, Mukesh Ambani,  Verghese Kurien.

There are 2 awards every year:
Award I: The main award is given to a person in recognition of his lifetime achievement and for his original contribution to the field of science & technology
Award II: The second award is given to young and promising innovators, scientist and technologists who are also original contributors

The awards are given to any Indian citizen who has made original and outstanding contribution and done world class work in the field of science & technology and distinguished himself; the excellence may relate to any field of scientific endeavour from agriculture, engineering and medical sciences to space and environmental sciences.

List of awardees
Source: H K Firodia Foundation

See also 

 List of general science and technology awards

Notes

External links 
 
 

Indian science and technology awards
Awards established in 1996
1996 establishments in India